Deep Sea Warrior (Shen-Hai-Yong-Shi, or 深海勇士 in Chinese) bathyscaphe is a type of very little known deep-submergence vehicle built in the People’s Republic of China (PRC). Deep Sea Warrier was handed over from its builder China Shipbuilding Industry Corporation to its customer at the end of 2016, but actual deep diving did not begun until end of the following year due to preparation needed, because it was such as new product that thorough preparation was needed to ensure its safe operation, and bathyscaphye is capable of diving to a depth of 4500 meters.

In comparison to earlier Jiaolong where half of the components and technologies must be purchased abroad from foreign suppliers, 95% of technology and components of Deep Sea Warrier are domestically built and developed in China, with major subsystems including crew compartment, buoyancy material, lithium battery, propulsion system, deep water pump, mechanical arm, hydraulic system, acoustic communication system, control system and underwater positioning system have all successfully passed certification.

The general designer of Deep Sea Warrior is Mr. Hu Zhen (胡震), who has revealed that during the development of Deep Sea Warrior, the difficulties encountered was far greater than expected, particularly in the area of crew compartment design, buoyancy material, deep water pump, and propulsion system, so as a result, it took more than half a decade to complete the development of such subsystems, longer than originally planned three to four years. However, the delay in development is well worth it when measured in the advancement made, for example, the lithium battery has a live of five years and can be used for five hundred times, in comparison to the silver-zinc battery that can only be used for fifty times, resulting in overall cheaper operating cost of Deep Sea Warrior in comparison to earlier bathyscaphes using older technologies. The navigation and positioning system onboard can position Deep Sea Warrior to accuracy of less a meter. Currently, the motherships of Deep Sea Warrior is Chinese research vessel Explorer 1(Tan-Suo 1, or 探索一号 in Chinese), and Explorer 2. Specification:
Length: 9.3 m
Beam: 3 m
Height: 4 m
Weight: 20 t
Speed: 2.5 kt
Payload: 220 kg
Max diving depth: 4500 m
Crew: 3
Propulsion: Fuel & lithium battery
Diameter of crew compartment: 2.1 m
Endurance: 10 hours

See also
Bathyscaphe
Deep-submergence vehicle
DSV Alvin
DSV Shinkai 2000
DSV Shinkai 6500
Harmony
Ictineu 3
Jiaolong
Konsul-class submersible
Mir
Nautile
Pisces IV
Pisces V
Priz-class deep-submergence rescue vehicle
Rainbowfish-class bathyscaphe
Sea Pole-class bathyscaphe
Struggler

References

Auxiliary ships of the People's Liberation Army Navy
Ships of the People's Liberation Army Navy